The Jacky Cheung 1/2 Century World Tour (Chinese: 张学友1/2世界巡迴演唱會) was a concert tour by Hong Kong singer and actor Jacky Cheung (Chinese: 张学友), one of the "Four Heavenly Kings" also known as "God of Songs", named in honor of his 50th birthday, marking a half-century of life in song and dance. The tour opened on 30 December 2010 at the Mercedes-Benz Arena, Shanghai and concluded on 20 May 2012 at the Hong Kong Coliseum, Hong Kong, consisting of 146 shows performed in 77 cities. The total audience was more than 2.8 million attendees with the number of people wanting to see the show exceeding the limited number of tickets.

Jacky Cheung was the artistic director of the tour. Andrew Tuason was the music director and Chen Xiaobin the choreographer, both of whom had worked with Cheung on previous projects. The Guangzhou Philharmonic Orchestra performed the string accompaniment for his concert tour. Florence Chan and Star Entertainment Limited produced the tour as the tour directors.

The staging included an oversize LED screen, theatrical production and changing sets along with laser lights and pyrotechnics for Cheung's repertoire of pop classics, songs from his musicals, rock, ballad, and jazz songs. Li Kwok Hoi served as the lighting director and one of technical directors, was awarded Best Collaboration Award from Cheung's team and all the concert organizers. IEC handled the design and set up of lighting system and stage.

Jacky Cheung broke his own record for the greatest number of concerts held by a Chinese singer in a single tour. He holds the Guinness World Record for "the largest combined audience of a live act in a year" with a total of 2,048,553 audiences in twelve months.

Performance 
Cheung's performance included segments in the style of a Broadway musical, a live action movie, an animated short film, and a jazz club.  Andrew Lau, Hong Kong filmmaker, directed a love story between Cheung and Shu Qi, Taiwanese actress, played out on the stage while being shown on three screens in the background.

Cheung performed for three hours, singing and dancing, without any guest artists. He wore changing costumes, including a white tuxedo and top hat and shoes embroidered with Swarovski crystals.

He sang Mandarin songs including Ru Guo Ai (Perhaps, Love)  and Wen Bie (Goodbye Kiss) and Cantonese songs including Love Is Like A Dream, Snow.Wolf.Lake, Love You A Little More Each Day, Double Trouble, Let It Go, Fei Je and others from his Private Corner album.

Press conference 
On 24 November 2010, Cheung held a press conference to announce his "1/2 Century" tour, named to coincide with his 50th birthday and commemorate his achievement in the music industry.

On 17 January 2011, a press conference for the 1/2 Century Tour was held at the Marriott Grand Hotel in Nanning.

Jacky Cheung 1/2 Century Tour Live Concert DVD 
July 2013, Cheung released his Jacky Cheung 1/2 Century Tour Live Concert DVD.  The album had pre-sales of 40,000 copies, for which he received two double platinum discs from Universal Music. It was released as DVD, Blu-ray disc, and CD.

Set list 
The following set list was obtained from the concerts held at Asia-World Arena, Hong Kong in May 2012. It does not represent all concerts for the duration of the tour.

 "Overture"
 "The Playboy"
 "What's Your Name, Girl"
 "First Kiss"
 "You're My Only Legend"
 "You're First Name, My Surname" 
 "Before the Rain"
 "Willing"
 "A Tear Drop"
 "Rain (Intrumental)"
 "Man in the Rain"
 "The Three Beats of Love"
 "Perhaps. Love"
 "Rock Prelude" 
 "The Weather is So Hot"
 "Goodbye Kiss"
 "When Love Becomes Habit"
 "I Should"
 "Lydia"
 "Obsess Over You" 
 "After You've Gone"
 "Love Net"
 "Lover's Tear"
 "I'm Really Hurt"
 "Life is Like a Dream"
 "Summer Night (Instrumental)"
 "Double Trouble"
 "Band Introduction"
 "Li Xiang Lan"
 "Love You More and More Everyday"
 "An Unchanged Heart"
 "Never Ending Past Love"
 "Untraceable Heartbreak"
 "Cut My Heart"
 "Hungry Wolf"
 "Messy Hair"
 "This Winter's Not Too Cold"
 "My Faraway Girl"
 "How Can I Forget"
 "A Lonely Man"
 "Wanna Be With You Forever"
 "True Love Expression"
 "Blessing"

Tour cities

References

External links 
https://www.youtube.com/watch?v=WV3EyW06nbY

https://www.youtube.com/watch?v=sC-jSFnxr_8

https://www.youtube.com/playlist?list=OLAK5uy_nRptSY9SihwDqPrikDkSlNZ1gaom0BlW0
2011 concert tours
Concert tours of Asia
2010 concert tours
2012 concert tours